Mary O'Brien may refer to:

 Mary Ann O'Brien (born 1960), Irish politician
 Dusty Springfield (Mary Isobel Catherine Bernadette O'Brien, 1939–1999), British pop singer
 Mary K. O'Brien (born 1965), American politician and judge
 Mary O'Brien, 3rd Countess of Orkney (1721–1791), mute Irish countess
 Mary O'Brien, 4th Countess of Orkney (1755–1831), Scottish peeress
 Mary O'Brien (philosopher) (1926–1998), feminist political philosopher
 Mary O'Brien (writer) (fl. 1785–1790), Irish poet and playwright
 Mary Grace O'Brien (born 1958), judge of the Virginia Court of Appeals
 Mary F. O'Brien, United States Air Force general 
 Mary O'Brien Harris (1865–1938), British politician